Belubula River, a perennial river that is part of the Lachlan catchment within the Murray–Darling basin, is located in the central west region of New South Wales, Australia.

Location and features

The name is derived from the Australian Aboriginal meaning for stony river or big lagoon. The original inhabitants of the land alongside the Belubula River are the Indigenous Australians of the Wiradjuri clan.

Towns on the Belubula River, from its source towards its mouth, include Blayney, Carcoar, and Canowindra.

The New South Wales government the potential for a new dam of up to 700 gigalitres at Cranky Rock on the Belubula River. However, in 2018 the proposal was shelved due to environmental concerns.

Gallery

See also

References

External links

 

Tributaries of the Lachlan River
Rivers of New South Wales